The 2022 United States House of Representatives elections in Arizona were held on November 8, 2022, to determine the nine representatives of the state of Arizona. The elections coincided with the 2022 Arizona gubernatorial election, as well as other elections to the U.S. House of Representatives, the U.S. Senate, and various other state and local elections. Despite losing the concurrent Senate and Governor elections,  the Republicans flipped both the 2nd and 6th congressional districts, making this the first time that the party controlled 6 seats in Arizona since 2004.

Primaries in Arizona took place on August 2.

Overview

District

District 1

The district contains much of the northeast suburbs of Phoenix. It is similar in composition and structure to the old 6th district, though it is more competitive and slightly larger; in addition, the district now contains central Phoenix and most of the downtown area. Schweikert narrowly defeated Democrat Jevin Hodge in what proved to be the year's closest House race in the state.

Republican primary

Candidates

Nominee
David Schweikert, incumbent U.S. Representative for

Eliminated in primary
Elijah Norton, businessman

Failed to qualify
Mavrick Moser

Declined
Christina Smith

Endorsements

Results

Democratic primary

Candidates

Nominee
Jevin Hodge, Vice Chair of the Arizona Democratic Party and candidate for the Maricopa County Board of Supervisors in 2020

Eliminated in primary
Adam Metzendorf, former director of membership experience for the Phoenix Suns, the Phoenix Mercury, and the Arizona Rattlers

Withdrew
Ginger Sykes Torres, environmental consultant and community activist

Failed to qualify
Delina DiSanto, registered nurse (write-in)
Eric Ulis, crime historian
John Williamson

Endorsements

Results

General election

Predictions

Polling

Results

District 2

Redistricting made the seat considerably more Republican. O'Halleran ran for re-election and lost to Republican businessman Eli Crane.

Democratic primary

Candidates

Nominee
Tom O'Halleran, incumbent U.S. Representative and Co-Chair of the Blue Dog Coalition

Withdrawn
Judy Stahl, candidate for Arizona's 1st legislative district in 2020 (endorsed O'Halleran)

Endorsements

Results

Republican primary

Candidates

Nominee
Eli Crane, businessman and former U.S. Navy SEAL

Eliminated in primary
Steven Krystofiak, farmer
Walter Blackman, state representative from the 6th district
Ron Watkins, far-right QAnon conspiracy theorist and former administrator of 8chan
Andy Yates, small business owner
Mark DeLuzio, business consultant

Did not file
Myron Lizer, Vice President of the Navajo Nation

Endorsements

Debates and forums

Polling

Results

General election

Predictions

Polling 

Generic Democrat vs. generic Republican

Results

District 3

The new 3rd district closely resembles the old 7th district. Gallego ran for and won re-election.

Democratic primary

Candidates

Nominee
Ruben Gallego, incumbent U.S. Representative

Endorsements

Results

Republican primary

Candidates

Nominee
Jeff Zink, former adjunct professor at Grand Canyon University

Failed to qualify 
Nina Becker

Results

General election

Predictions

Results

District 4

Whereas the 9th district contained downtown Phoenix, the new 4th district is more rural and is highly competitive. Stanton successfully ran for re-election. The Democratic Congressional Campaign Committee labelled Stanton as vulnerable on the day of Jerone Davison's kick-off event.

Democratic primary

Candidates

Nominee
Greg Stanton, incumbent U.S. Representative

Endorsements

Results

Republican primary 
The Republican primary for had six qualified candidates. David Giles, a perennial candidate, Tanya Contreras Wheelas, a former staffer of Arizona senator Martha McSally, and Alex Stovall, a U.S. Army veteran were the first to announce. In December 2021, secretly recorded conversations with Stovall dismissing his constituents and "flip-flopping" on statements he had made throughout his campaign were released. Jerone Davison, a former Oakland Raiders running back and longtime pastor in Maricopa County, launched an exploratory campaign in November 2021. On the 28th of January, the day of Davison's official announcement and kick-off event, the Democratic Congressional Campaign Committee labelled incumbent Democrat Greg Stanton as vulnerable. Also running were U.S. Navy Veteran Rene Lopez, Co-founder of Cece's Hope Center that helps young women from sex-trafficking, 2 term Chandler City Councilman Rene Lopez, and largely self-funded businessman Kelly Cooper.

Candidates

Nominee 
 Kelly Cooper, restaurant owner and U.S. Marine Corps veteran

Eliminated in primary
Rene Lopez, Chandler city councilor, co-founder of Cece's Hope Center, and U.S. Navy veteran
Jerone Davison, former running back for the Las Vegas Raiders and pastor
Tanya Contreras Wheeless, former staffer for U.S. Senator Martha McSally

Withdrew
Jana Jackson, professor and aerospace education specialist
Orlando Johnson
Tony Montanarella, ex-police officer and U.S. Marine Corps veteran
Justin Musgrove, loan officer
Saul A. Rodriguez
Alex Stovall, U.S. Army veteran

Endorsements

Debates and forums

Results

General election

Predictions

Polling

Results

District 5

The incumbent is Republican Andy Biggs, who was re-elected with 58.9% of the vote in 2020. The new 5th district is slightly smaller than its predecessor, but is still not competitive. Biggs ran for re-election.

Republican primary

Candidates

Nominee
Andy Biggs, incumbent U.S. Representative

Endorsements

Results

Democratic primary

Candidates

Nominee
Javier Ramos, attorney and candidate for this seat in 2020

Failed to qualify 
Ben Larivee, U.S. Marine Corps veteran

Results

Independents

Declared
Clint Smith, attorney

Endorsements

General election

Debates and forums

Predictions

Results

District 6

She did not run for re-election. The new 6th district covers the Southeast corner of the state, with many heavily Democratic parts being absorbed into the 7th district.

Democratic primary

Candidates

Nominee
Kirsten Engel, former state senator and former state representative from the 10th district

Eliminated in primary
Daniel Hernández Jr., state representative from the 2nd district
Avery Anderson, engineer

Failed to qualify
Marcos Urrea, legal assistant to Immigration Equality

Withdrew
Randy Friese, state representative from the 9th district

Declined
Ann Kirkpatrick, incumbent U.S. Representative

Fundraising 
Friese led early fundraising, followed by Engel, followed by Hernández.

Endorsements

Debates and forums

Polling

Results

Republican primary

Candidates

Nominee
Juan Ciscomani, senior advisor to Governor Doug Ducey and vice chair of the Arizona-Mexico Commission

Eliminated in primary
Lucretia Free, Founder and Publisher of The Vail Voice
Brandon Martin, U.S. Army veteran, candidate for Arizona's 2nd congressional district in 2018 and 2020
Young Mayberry, teacher and farmer
Kathleen Winn, former local television reporter

Withdrew
Kelly Townsend, state senator from the 16th district
Douglas Lowell, surgeon
Marissa Mitchell

Endorsements

Debates and forums

Results

General election

Predictions

Debates and forums

Polling

Results

District 7

The district is very similar to its predecessor, but it covers more of the Mexico–United States border. Redistricting made the district less competitive. Grijalva ran for re-election and the Republican nominee, naturalized citizen and Uruguayan immigrant Luis Pozzolo, competed against him.

Democratic primary

Candidates

Nominee
Raúl Grijalva, incumbent U.S. Representative

Endorsements

Results

Republican primary

Candidates

Nominee
Luis Pozzolo, Uruguayan immigrant and small business owner

Eliminated in primary
Nina Becker, business consultant

Withdrew
Joshua Pembleton, former Green Beret

Results

General election

Predictions

Debates and forums

Results

District 8

The incumbent is Republican Debbie Lesko, who was re-elected with 59.6% of the vote in 2020. The new 8th district is slightly northeast of its predecessor, covering the northwest Phoenix suburbs. Lesko ran for re-election unopposed.

Republican primary

Candidates

Nominee
Debbie Lesko, incumbent U.S. Representative

Endorsements

Results

Democratic primary

Failed to qualify 
James Holmes

General election

Write-in candidates 
Alixandra Guzman
Jeremy Spreitzer

Predictions

Results

District 9

The new 9th district is still not competitive, but it is somewhat more so than the old 4th district; much of the old 4th district was drawn into the new 2nd district. Gosar won re-election unopposed.

Republican primary

Candidates

Nominee
Paul Gosar, incumbent U.S. Representative

Eliminated in primary
Randy Kutz, corporate trainer and realtor
Adam Morgan, West Point graduate and former U.S. Army Ranger

Failed to qualify 
Brandon DeHart

Endorsements

Results

Democratic primary

Candidates

Eliminated in primary
David Lucier (write-in)
Gene Scharer (write-in)

Failed to qualify
Matthew Daniel

Results

General election

Write-in candidates 
Richard Grayson, writer and performance artist
Tom T. (Thomas Tzitzura)

Predictions

Results

See also
2022 Arizona elections
2022 United States Senate election in Arizona

Notes

Partisan clients

References

External links

Official campaign websites for 1st district candidates
Jevin Hodge (D) for Congress
David Schweikert (R) for Congress

Official campaign websites for 2nd district candidates
Eli Crane (R) for Congress
Tom O'Halleran (D) for Congress

Official campaign websites for 3rd district candidates
Ruben Gallego (D) for Congress
Jeff Zink (R) for Congress

Official campaign websites for 4th district candidates
Kelly Cooper (R) for Congress
Greg Stanton (D) for Congress 
Tanya Wheeless (R) for Congress

Official campaign websites for 5th district candidates
Andy Biggs (R) for Congress
Javier Ramos (D) for Congress

Official campaign websites for 6th district candidates
Juan Ciscomani (R) for Congress
Kirsten Engel (D) for Congress

Official campaign websites for 7th district candidates
Raúl Grijalva (D) for Congress
Luis Pozzolo (R) for Congress

Official campaign websites for 8th district candidates
Debbie Lesko (R) for Congress
Jeremy Speitzer (Write-in) for Congress
Alixandria Guzman (Write-in) for Congress
David Bies (Write-in) for Congress

Official campaign websites for 9th district candidates
Paul Gosar (D) for Congress
Richard Grayson (Write-in) for Congress

2022
Arizona
United States House of Representatives